Besson Spur is a rock spur that descends north between Papitashvili Valley and Hernandez Valley in the Apocalypse Peaks of Victoria Land. It was named after David Z. Besson, Physics Department, University of Kansas, Lawrence; AMANDA and related research at Amundsen–Scott South Pole Station; eight field seasons 1997–2004.

References

Cliffs of Victoria Land